The 2008 World Mixed Doubles Curling Championship was held March 8–15, 2008 in Vierumäki, Finland at the Vierumäki Ice Rink. It was the first mixed doubles world championships organized by the World Curling Federation.

Switzerland scored two perfect ends in Draw 2 against Wales, a rare feat.

Teams

Not Competing
The following teams were initially listed as participating in this event but on February 24, 2008 updated schedule they are not included.

Round robin

Results

Blue group

Draw 1
March 8, 2008 09:00

Draw 2
March 8, 2008 19:30

Draw 3
March 9, 2008 16:00

Draw 4
March 10, 2008 12:30

Draw 5
March 11, 2008 09:00

Draw 6
March 11, 2008 19:30

Draw 7

Red group

Draw 1
March 8, 2008 12:30

Draw 2
March 9, 2008 09:00

Draw 3
March 9, 2008 19:30

Draw 4
March 10, 2008 16:00

Draw 5
March 11, 2008 12:30

Draw 6
March 12, 2008 09:00

Draw 7

Green group

Draw 1
March 8, 16:00

Draw 2
March 9, 12:30

Draw 3
March 10, 09:00

Draw 4
March 10, 19:30

Draw 5
March 11, 16:00

Draw 6
March 12, 12:30

Draw 7
March 13, 09:00

Tie break

Red group
March 13, 12:30

Playoffs

Semifinal challenge 1
March 14, 2008 09:00

Semifinal challenge 2
March 14, 2008 13:00

Brackets

Semifinal
March 14, 2008 18:00

Bronze medal game
March 15, 2008 12:00

Gold medal game
March 15, 2008 12:00

References

See also
 2008 Brier
 2008 World Men's Curling Championship
 2008 World Junior Curling Championships
 2008 Ford World Women's Curling Championship
 2008 Scotties Tournament of Hearts

World Mixed Doubles Curling Championship, 2008
World Mixed Doubles Curling Championship
International curling competitions hosted by Finland
Sport in Heinola
Vierumäki